C. densifolia may refer to:

 Calceolaria densifolia, a lady's purse
 Calyptranthes densifolia, a flowering plant
 Canna densifolia, a garden plant
 Caraipa densifolia, a flowering plant
 Chimonobambusa densifolia, an evergreen plant